Green Hill Cemetery is located in Greensboro, North Carolina and it on 51 acres of rolling land. Opened in 1877, it is Greensboro's oldest publicly operated cemetery. The cemetery is managed by the Greensboro Parks & Recreation Department. Tours of the cemetery are held by Friends of Green Hill Cemetery, a non-profit organization. 

Green Hill Cemetery is also home to a plethora of plants and more than 700 different types of trees. They are cataloged and maintained by the Friends of Green Hill Cemetery and the city of Greensboro.

The 2006 horror film, The Gravedancers, was shot at Green Hill Cemetery.

In June 2020, a monument marking the mass grave of Confederate soldiers, owned by the Sons of Confederate Veterans, was vandalized and torn down.

Notable burials
 Kay Hagan (1953–2019), US Senator
 Lunsford Richardson Preyer (1919–2001), US Congressman
 Ethel Clay Price (1874–1943), nurse and socialite
 Alfred Moore Scales (1827–1892), Civil War general and US Congressman

References 

Cemeteries in North Carolina
Buildings and structures in Greensboro, North Carolina